para-Cresol, also 4-methylphenol, is an organic compound with the formula CH3C6H4(OH).  It is a colourless solid that is widely used intermediate in the production of other chemicals. It is a derivative of phenol and is an isomer of o-cresol and m-cresol.

Production
Together with many other compounds, p-cresol is conventionally extracted from coal tar, the volatilized materials obtained in the roasting of coal to produce coke. This residue contains a few percent by weight of phenol and cresols. Industrially, p-cresol is currently prepared mainly by a two-step route beginning with the sulfonation of toluene:
CH3C6H5 + H2SO4 → CH3C6H4SO3H + H2O
Basic hydrolysis of the sulfonate salt gives the sodium salt of the cresol:
CH3C6H4SO3H + 2 NaOH → CH3C6H4OH + Na2SO3 + H2O
Other methods for the production of p-cresol include chlorination of toluene followed by hydrolysis. In the cymene-cresol process, toluene is alkylated with propene to give p-cymene, which can be oxidatively dealkylated in a manner similar to the cumene process.

Applications 
p-Cresol is consumed mainly in the production of antioxidants, such as butylated hydroxytoluene (BHT). The monoalkylated derivatives undergo coupling to give an extensive family of diphenol antioxidants. These antioxidants are valued because they are relatively low in toxicity and nonstaining.

Natural occurrences

In humans 
p-Cresol is produced by bacterial fermentation of protein in the human large intestine. It is excreted in feces and urine, and is a component of human sweat that attracts female mosquitoes.

p-Cresol is a constituent of tobacco smoke.

In other species 
p-Cresol is a major component in pig odor. Temporal glands secretion examination showed the presence of phenol and p-cresol during musth in male elephants. It is one of the very few compounds to attract the orchid bee Euglossa cyanura and has been used to capture and study the species. p-Cresol is a component found in horse urine during estrus that can elicit the Flehmen response.

References 

Cresols
Alkylphenols